is a Japanese actor from Kitakami, Iwate. He is best known for his roles as Shuichiro Oishi in The Prince of Tennis (musical series, Tenimyu, live film adaptation), and as Jyan Kandou (Geki Red) in the tokusatsu television series, Juken Sentai Gekiranger. He is also part of a young men's stage acting troupe, D-Boys, which perform in various skit-like performances.

Career
He has appeared in a various number of TV shows.

On January 1, 2006, Suzuki, with fellow D-Boys member Masaki Kaji, appeared on the broadcast of Secret New Years' Performance Tournament "Young Man Colosseum", where both boys were able to display their acrobatic abilities. In 2007, Suzuki will again appear on the New Year's Day 44th broadcast of Secret New Years' Performance Tournament'''s "Chinese Lion Dance" segment, with Masaki Kaji and fellow D-Boys members Yuya Endo, Masato Wada, and Yuuma Minakawa.

Next, he appeared as a member of The Tigers, in the TV drama The Hit Parade, which aired May 26, 2006 on Fuji TV and co-starred fellow D-Boys members Masato Wada, Yuu Shirota, Masaki Kaji, Hirofumi Araki, Yuya Endo, and Kōji Seto.

With the D-Boys
In October 2004, Suzuki joined the Watanabe Entertainment group named the D-Boys.

As a member of the D-Boys, Suzuki also keeps a blog, which he updates occasionally.

On August 6, 2005, Suzuki, along with fellow D-Boys member Masaki Kaji, appeared on the radio program Marvelous Radio Vibration, hosted by fellow D-Boys members Yuu Shirota and Kotaro Yanagi.

The D-Boys so far have released two Photobooks. The first photobook released on April 27, 2005, was self-titled D-Boys, while the second, released on March 15, 2006, was called Start, both of which contain many photos of Suzuki.

The D-Boys have also starred in their own drama documentary variety series called, DD-Boys in which Suzuki's appeared in various episodes as himself. The show was 24 episodes long and ran from April 10 to September 25, 2006.

In June 2007, the D-Boys starred in their very own musical together called, D-Boys Stage, which ran from June 3 to June 10 at the Space Zero theater in Tokyo. Suzuki appeared in the musical as a guest performer, making select appearances on June 6 and June 9.

As Shuichiro Oishi in The Prince of Tennis musicals
Suzuki won the role of Shuichiro Oishi, the motherly vice-captain regular of Seigaku Middle School's tennis club, in The Prince of Tennis musicals, Tenimyu. From 2005 to 2006, he became the second actor to play Oishi as part of the second generation Seigaku cast. He made his debut as Oishi on January 8, 2005 in the Side Yamabuki performance in Osaka. That same year, his role as Oishi was carried into the live adaptation film of the manga. During his run in the musicals, he was able to work with fellow D-Boys members Yuya Endo, Kotaro Yanagi, Masaki Kaji, Osamu Adachi, Hirofumi Araki, Masato Wada, and former member Yuu Shirota.

On March 29, 2006, in the Dream Live 3rd concert, Suzuki, along with the majority of the Seigaku cast, graduated from their roles. Since his graduation, the role of Oishi has been played by Yukihiro Takiguchi, Yuya Toyoda and Yuki Tsujimoto, and currently by actor Jin Hiramaki.

As Shuichiro Oishi in The Prince of Tennis live-action film
Suzuki was able to carry on his role from the musicals to the live-adaptation film of the manga series of The Prince of Tennis. He, along with most of the principal cast members for the Seigaku Regulars, were able to reprise their roles in the movie. The only major casting change was the casting of Kanata Hongo as Ryoma Echizen, the main protagonist. The Prince of Tennis was released on May 13, 2006 and opened on the tenth spot in the Japanese Box Office and marked Suzuki's first appearance in the film industry.

In June Bride
Suzuki's next movie, the June Bride (Jyun Bride) opened on May 27, 2006. He played one of the supporting characters, costarring with fellow D-Boys members Yuu Shirota and Hirofumi Araki. The movie's based on the original manga Jun Bride, by Yoshida Satoshi.

In Limit~ What's Your Story?
From June 2 to June 4, 2006, Suzuki starred in the play, as one of the main characters, appearing alongside fellow D-Boys Araki Hirofumi and Yuichi Nakamura.

As Geki Red in Juken Sentai Gekiranger
On February 18, 2007, Suzuki starred as Jyan Kandou aka Geki Red, a Gekiranger who was brought up by tigers and befriended by pandas so that his senses have become sharply enhanced to feel with his body, rather than the brain in the Super Sentai series called Juken Sentai Gekiranger (adapted as Power Rangers: Jungle Fury in America), which premiered on TV Asahi. The show also costars Suzuki's fellow D-Boys member, Hirofumi Araki, as Jyan's rival, Rio, the "Black Lion".

Photobook and Idol DVD
It was announced then that Suzuki, along with Hirofumi Araki and Kōji Seto would be getting solo photobooks and DVDs called the "Prince Series." Suzuki's solo photobook would be released on April 19, 2007 while his solo idol DVD would be released on May 16, 2007. The three of them will be following Yuu Shirota, Yuya Endo, Kotaro Yanagi and Shunji Igarashi as the only D-Boys that have released an idol DVD while following Kotaro Yanagi, Shunji Igarashi and later, Yuu Shirota, as the only D-Boys to have released a solo photobook.

Personal life
Suzuki keeps a blog on his D-Boys webpage, which he updates occasionally. Some years ago, in his blog entries, he liked to call himself "Snufkin" after one of his favorite animated characters, but he is most often called Zukki (a nickname created by Masato Wada) by fans and other D-Boys.

Filmography

Stage

Radio
 D-Radio Boys Super (October - December, 2011), with Hirofumi Araki
 Koi no Daisōsasen (November 23, 2012) - "Gekiraji! Live" (NHK Radio 1)
 JFN Saturday Drama House "Bidanshi Gekijyou" (December, 2016) - "Tsurugi no Chikai"

Official DVDs

Official photobooks
 Prince Series D-Boys Collection - Hiroki Suzuki (April 19, 2007)
 Kimi ga Warattekurerunara... (May 29, 2008)
 360° (August 25, 2009)

Events
 Araki Hirofumi - History EP2 - ZukiAra ~ Otona no 32129 Halloween ~ (October 19, 2019)

Television commercials
 Bandai Charadeco Christmas (2007)
 Gerolsteiner mineral water (2008)
 Sukiya Kinpira Konnyaku Gyudon'' (2012)

References

External links
 Official Twitter (@zukky1003) 
 Official Ameba blog 
Previous blog 
Official profile page 
 
 

1983 births
Living people
Japanese male actors
People from Iwate Prefecture